Taiwanese singer Selina Jen has released one studio album and one Extended play. She is a member of the Taiwanese girl-group S.H.E, and released her debut solo album, 3.1415, in 2015.

Albums

Studio albums

Extended plays

Singles

Collaborations

Soundtracks

References

Jen, Selina
Jen, Selina
Discography